Barlavington is a small village and civil parish in the Chichester district of West Sussex, England. The village is situated about four miles (6 km) south of Petworth, east of the A285 road. At the 2011 Census the population was included in the civil parish of Sutton.

The nearest railway station is five miles (8 km) northeast of the village, at Pulborough.

St Mary's Church was built between 1160 and 1190.  Most of the church was built in Early English style.

The parish covers an area of 397 hectares (980 acres). According to the 2001 census it had a population of 117 people living in 35 households. Owing to the presence of a retirement home only 36 people were economically active.

References

External links
 
 

Villages in West Sussex
Chichester District